Matti Risto Väinö Jaatinen (15 April 1928, Jyväskylä – 29 July 2005) was a Finnish politician. He was a Member of the Parliament of Finland from 1970 to 1984, representing the National Coalition Party. He served as the Governor of Kymi Province from 1984 to 1993.

References

1928 births
2005 deaths
People from Jyväskylä
National Coalition Party politicians
Members of the Parliament of Finland (1970–72)
Members of the Parliament of Finland (1972–75)
Members of the Parliament of Finland (1975–79)
Members of the Parliament of Finland (1979–83)
Members of the Parliament of Finland (1983–87)